Diego Kochen (born March 19, 2006) is an American professional soccer player currently playing as a goalkeeper for Barcelona.

Club career
Born in Miami, Florida, to a Peruvian mother and Venezuelan father, Kochen started his career with the academy of Weston, initially starting his career as an outfield player, before switching to goalkeeper at the age of eight to cover for an ill teammate. He also played for West Pines United in Florida and, after his parents moved to Catalonia in 2018 for work-related reasons, he played for the Marcet Football Academy as well as TecnoFutbol CF.

Having progressed through Barcelona's La Masia academy, he signed his first professional contract with the club in March 2022.

International career
Kochen has represented the United States at youth international level. He remains eligible to represent Peru or Venezuela.

References

2006 births
Living people
Soccer players from Miami
Soccer players from Florida
American sportspeople of Peruvian descent
American sportspeople of Venezuelan descent
American soccer players
United States men's youth international soccer players
Association football goalkeepers
Weston FC players
FC Barcelona players
American expatriate soccer players
American expatriate sportspeople in Spain
Expatriate footballers in Spain